Sarband-e Gaviad (also Romanized as Sarband-e Gavīād) is a village in Shusef Rural District, Shusef District, Nehbandan County, South Khorasan Province, Iran. At the 2006 census, its population was 88, spread among 25 families.

References 

Populated places in Nehbandan County